Jack Lonie (born 13 August 1996) is a former Australian rules football player who played for the St Kilda Football Club in the Australian Football League (AFL) from 2015 to 2021.

AFL career
Recruited from the Dandenong Stingrays in the TAC Cup, Lonie was drafted by the St Kilda Football Club with their fourth selection and forty-first overall in the 2014 national draft.

During the 2016 season, Lonie was considered to have not played as well as he had in his debut season, as he played only 10 games, spending a large amount of the year playing for the VFL club Sandringham. Despite this, he drew positive attention for a three-goal performance in the final round of the year

In October 2018, Lonie signed a two-year contract extension with St Kilda, keeping him at the club until at least the end of 2020. During the 2019 season, Lonie's performance against the Western Bulldogs in round 18 was considered impressive. 

In October 2021, Lonie was delisted by the St Kilda Football Club. He had played 87 games for the club.

References

External links

1996 births
Living people
Dandenong Stingrays players
Australian rules footballers from Victoria (Australia)
St Kilda Football Club players
Sandringham Football Club players